Chidiebere Ibe is a Nigerian medical illustrator, a student at Kyiv Medical University in Ukraine, and the lead medical illustrator of the International Center for Genetic Disease at Brigham and Women's Hospital, Harvard Medical School. Chidiebere Sunday Ibe is from Ebonyi State in Nigeria. he was born 31 March 1996. Having lost his mother to surgery for fibroid, he became passionate about medicine, especially as it relates to mothers and children. He is a self-taught medical illustrator. He learnt to draw medical illustrations using just a computer mouse. He is aspiring to be a pediatric neurosurgeon.

Education and career 
He is a graduate of Chemistry from the University of Uyo, Akwa Ibom State. In 2020, he became creative director of the Journal of Global Neurosurgery, and lead medical illustrator of the International Center for Genetic Disease at Harvard Medical School. In 2021, he raised money for tuition to attend Kyiv Medical University in Ukraine, and enrolled as a first-year medical student the same year. Ibe aspires to be a neurosurgeon.  Ibe is currently Research Fellow, Association of Future African Neurosurgeons. He is a Pioneer Member of  Community-Based Primary Health Care Community of Practice. he is currently the Chief Medical Illustrator and Creative Director – Journal of Global Neurosurgery. Creative Director–Continental Association of African Neurosurgical Societies, (YNF). He is also Creative Director–Association of Future African Neurosurgeons, AFAN. He currently also a Junior Member – World Federation of Neurosurgical Societies, Global Neurosurgery Committee.

Medical illustrations 

In July 2020, Ibe began drawing medical illustrations with Black people as subjects in response to the use of white subjects in the vast majority of such illustrations, hoping to promote diversity in the illustrations used by the medical textbooks used in medical training, and noting that "many conditions and signs look different based on the patient’s skin colour and therefore the black skin should be equally represented." He has illustrated various medical subjects including a fetus in a womb as well as excema. In early December 2021, he went viral on social media as a result of his illustrations. His fetus-in-womb illustration had received more than 81,000 likes .

References

External links 
Website

Medical illustrators
Date of birth missing (living people)
Medical students
21st-century Nigerian people
Living people
1996 births